Javier Rosas Sierra (born September 25, 1974, in Guadalajara) is a male athlete from Mexico.  He competes in the triathlon.

Rosas competed at the second Olympic triathlon at the 2004 Summer Olympics.  He placed forty-fourth with a total time of 2:04:03.97.

References
 Profile
sports-reference

Mexican male triathletes
1974 births
Living people
Triathletes at the 1999 Pan American Games
Triathletes at the 2003 Pan American Games
Triathletes at the 2004 Summer Olympics
Triathletes at the 2007 Pan American Games
Olympic triathletes of Mexico
Sportspeople from Guadalajara, Jalisco
Central American and Caribbean Games gold medalists for Mexico
Competitors at the 2002 Central American and Caribbean Games
Central American and Caribbean Games medalists in triathlon
Pan American Games competitors for Mexico
21st-century Mexican people